The 2004 NCAA Division I softball tournament was the twenty-third annual tournament to determine the national champion of NCAA women's collegiate softball. Held during May 2004, sixty-four Division I college softball teams contested the championship. The tournament featured eight regionals of eight teams, each in a double elimination format. The 2004 Women's College World Series was held in Oklahoma City, Oklahoma from May 27 through May 31 and marked the conclusion of the 2004 NCAA Division I softball season. UCLA won their eleventh NCAA championship and twelfth overall by defeating  3–1 in the final game.  LSU pitcher Kristin Schmidt was named Women's College World Series Most Outstanding Player.

Qualifying

Regionals

Regional No. 1

Regional No. 2

Regional No. 3

Regional No. 4

Regional No. 5

Regional No. 6

Regional No. 7

Regional No. 8

Women's College World Series

Participants

*: Excludes UCLA's vacated 1995 WCWS participation.

†: Excludes results of the pre-NCAA Women's College World Series of 1969 through 1981.

Bracket

Bracket

Game results

Championship game

All-Tournament Team
The following players were members of the All-Tournament Team:

Notes

References

2004 NCAA Division I softball season
NCAA Division I softball tournament